The little green woodpecker, or golden-backed woodpecker, (Campethera maculosa) is a species of bird in the family Picidae. It is found in Africa, living in forest edges, clearings, and forest-shrub mosaics. The International Union for Conservation of Nature (IUCN) has assessed it as a least-concern species.

Taxonomy
This species was described by Achille Valenciennes in 1826, as Picus maculosus. 

There are two subspecies:

 C. m. maculosa (Valenciennes, 1826) - Senegal and Guinea-Bissau to southwestern and south-central Ghana
 C. m. permista (Reichenow, 1876) - eastern Ghana and southwest South Sudan to northern Angola

The subspecies permista was formerly classified in the green-backed woodpecker (C. cailliautii), but was transferred to this species by Handbook of the Birds of the World, and in 2022 by the International Ornithological Congress. 

The little green and green-backed woodpeckers have hybridised in Ghana.

Description
The male's crown is olive-blackish with an indistinct reddish colour, and the nape is red. The head, neck and throat are buff, with brown spots. The upperparts are yellowish-green or bronze-green. The flight feathers are brown and have buffish bars. The tail is blackish, with some yellow and green. The underparts are buffish from the throat to the breast and greenish-white below the breast, all of the underparts having deep olive bars. The beak is olive or blackish, the eye is brown, and the legs are olive-grey. The female does not have red on the head and has buff spots on its crown and nape. The juvenile bird has greener upperparts with pale streaks, and its underparts are paler.

Distribution and habitat
The little green woodpecker is found in West Africa, in Senegal, Guinea-Bissau, Guinea, Sierra Leone, Liberia, Ivory Coast and Ghana. Its range would extend east to South Sudan, Uganda, Angola and the Democratic Republic of the Congo if C. cailliautii permista were included in this species.

Behaviour
This woodpecker eats arboreal ants. Its calls are a plaintive huweeeeh, a harsh whee, kewik, three to four teeay notes, and teerweet. It excavates nests in nests of ants and termites. It breeds in August and possibly in March and April.

Status
Logging and clearing of forests appears to be causing a population increase because the bird prefers open habitats. The species has a large range and increasing population, so the IUCN has assessed it as a least-concern species.

References

External links 
 
 

little green woodpecker
Birds of West Africa
little green woodpecker
Taxonomy articles created by Polbot